Amagasaki Memorial  Park Stadium is an athletic stadium in Amagasaki, Hyogo, Japan.

External links

Amagasaki
Cerezo Osaka
Football venues in Japan
Sports venues in Hyōgo Prefecture